United Nations Security Council resolution 1394, adopted unanimously on 27 February 2002, after reaffirming all previous resolutions on Western Sahara and its commitment to achieve a lasting solution to the dispute, the Council extended the mandate of the United Nations Mission for the Referendum in Western Sahara (MINURSO) until 30 April 2002.

The Security Council pledged to consider the Secretary-General Kofi Annan's "four options" for the future of the Western Sahara peace process described in his report, noting that both Morocco and Polisario Front had not fully co-operated with the United Nations in the settlement of their dispute. The four options were:

 The resumption of the implementation of the Settlement Plan without requiring agreements from both parties;
 The Secretary-General's Personal Envoy James A. Baker III would revise the framework agreement which would be presented to the parties on a non-negotiable basis;
 The Secretary-General's Personal Envoy James A. Baker III would determine if the parties would discuss a division of Western Sahara;
 The termination of the MINURSO operation.

See also
 Baker Plan
 Free Zone (region)
 Political status of Western Sahara
 List of United Nations Security Council Resolutions 1301 to 1400 (2000–2002)
 Sahrawi Arab Democratic Republic
 Moroccan Western Sahara Wall

References

External links
 
Text of the Resolution at undocs.org

 1394
2002 in Morocco
 1394
 1394
February 2002 events
2002 in Western Sahara